The 2019 Norfolk State Spartans football team represented Norfolk State University in the 2019 NCAA Division I FCS football season. They were led by fourth-year head coach Latrell Scott and played their home games at William "Dick" Price Stadium. They were a member of the Mid-Eastern Athletic Conference (MEAC). They finished the season 5–7, 4–4 in MEAC play to finish in fifth place.

Previous season

The Spartans finished the 2018 season 4–7, 2–5 in MEAC play to finish in a tie for eighth place.

Preseason

MEAC poll
In the MEAC preseason poll released on July 26, 2019, the Spartans were predicted to finish in seventh place.

Preseason All–MEAC teams
The Spartans had six players selected to the preseason all-MEAC teams.

Second Team Offense

Kenneth Kirby – OL

Third Team Offense

Aaron Savage – RB

Anthony Williams – TE

Second Team Defense

Nigel Chavis – LB

Bobby Price – DB

Nhyre' Quinerly – DB

Schedule

Game summaries

at Old Dominion

Virginia State

at Coastal Carolina

at Montana State

Florida A&M

North Carolina A&T

at Howard

at Bethune–Cookman

Morgan State

at North Carolina Central

at Delaware State

South Carolina State

References

Norfolk State
Norfolk State Spartans football seasons
Norfolk State Spartans football